Akshinsky District is an administrative and municipal district (raion), one of the thirty-one in Zabaykalsky Krai, Russia. It is located in the south of the krai and borders with Ononsky, Ulyotovsky, and Kyrinsky Districts of Zabaykalsky Krai, as well as with Mongolia. Administrative center is the rural locality (a selo) of Aksha. Population:  12,080 (2002 Census);  The population of Aksha accounts for 36.9% of the district's total population.

Geography
The Onon River flows through the district.

History
The district was established on March 4, 1926.

Economy
The district's landscape is suitable for agriculture. The mineral resources of the district include gold, uranium, precious stones, and timber.

References

Notes

Sources

Districts of Zabaykalsky Krai
States and territories established in 1926